Crock of Gold: A Few Rounds with Shane MacGowan is a 2020 documentary film about the life of Shane MacGowan. The film was directed by Julien Temple. Duration: 2h04

References

External links
 

2020 documentary films
2020 films
British documentary films
Documentary films about rock music and musicians
2020s British films